Details of the records and statistics for the Austrian football club SK Rapid Wien. All data based on the official club archive.

Players in bold are currently active for Rapid Wien.

Highest wins and losses

Highest Wins

League

Cup

International

Highest Losses

League

Cup

International

Goalscorers

For a ranking of league and total goals see article List of SK Rapid Wien players

International goals

Domestic cup goals

Includes both the Austrian Cup and the German Tschammerpokal during the annexation of Austria from 1938 to 1945.

Goals as substitute

Most goals in one game

Youngest and oldest goal scorers
Note: Some players in Rapid history have unknown birthdates and are therefore not considered in the following lists.

Youngest goal scorers

Oldest goal scorers

Top goalscorers by season

Bold means the player was also the leagues overall top goal scorer.

Appearances

For a ranking of league and total appearances see article List of SK Rapid Wien players

International appearances

Domestic cup appearances

Includes both the Austrian Cup and the German Tschammerpokal during the annexation of Austria from 1938 to 1945.

Youngest and oldest players
Note: Some players in Rapid history have unknown birthdates and are therefore not considered in the following lists.

Youngest players

Oldest players

Discipline

Most sending-offs

Most yellow cards

Being booked twice for a send off is counted as 2 yellow cards in this statistic.

European records

Non-UEFA competitions

UEFA competitions

References

External links

SK Rapid Wien
Rapid Wien